Andrew Lawrence is an English comedian known for his work in stand-up comedy, radio and television.

Early life and education
Lawrence attended Tiffin School and the University of St Andrews, where he began his stand-up career at a regular comedy night.

Stage career
Lawrence's university debut led to appearances at the Edinburgh Fringe; he was runner up in the 2003 So You Think You're Funny competition. Later, he won the Amused Moose Starsearch, York Comedy Festival New Act of the Year Competition and the BBC's New Act of the Year Competition in 2004.

He presented his first hour-long comedy show at the 2006 Edinburgh Festival Fringe entitled How to Butcher your Loved Ones. It was nominated for the if.comeddie award (as it was known for that year only) for Best Newcomer. His 2007 Fringe show, Social Leprosy For Beginners & Improvers, was nominated for the main if.comedy award. He has returned to the Fringe every year up to 2015.

As well as touring shows in the UK, Lawrence has performed abroad at the Just For Laughs Montreal Festival Showcase and the Melbourne International Comedy Festival.

TV and radio career

Lawrence has featured in numerous radio and TV shows, mostly as a stand-up performer. He has also appeared on television as a comic actor, playing the builder Marco in the BBC TV sitcom Ideal. He has written and performed four series for BBC Radio 4, most recently the 2015 sitcom There Is No Escape.

Reasons to Kill Yourself 
In 2015 his first book, Reasons to Kill Yourself, was published. The book is based on his stage show of the same name, which was largely about anything that annoyed him and with a particular focus on the state of the stand-up comedy landscape. Writing for Chortle, reviewer Jay Anderson wrote that "The poetic precision and rancid, colourful vocabulary of his stand-up are missing on the whole, the dense passages of escalating, poisonous adjective becoming increasingly less punchy as the book wears on."

Political views 
On 25 October 2014, Lawrence wrote a lengthy post on his official Facebook page drawing attention to a perceived rise in "'political' comedians cracking cheap and easy gags about UKIP, to the extent that it's got hack, boring and lazy very quickly" and described such comedians as being "out of touch, smug, superannuated, overpaid TV comics with their cosy lives in their west-London ivory towers taking a supercilious, moralising tone, pandering to the ever-creeping militant political correctness of the BBC". Although having previously appeared on several comedy programmes on the channel, he went on to describe "liberal back-slapping panel shows like Mock the Week" as consisting of "aging, balding, fat men, ethnic comedians and women-posing-as-comedians, sit congratulating themselves on how enlightened they are about the fact that UKIP are ridiculous and pathetic".

The post, and subsequent Twitter disputes with fellow comedians such as Dara Ó Briain and Frankie Boyle, were covered by the UK press. On 3 October 2015, he commented on his political beliefs in a post on his website, stating that "I've noticed a number of journalists in comedy have taken to labelling me a 'right-wing comedian'... I don't subscribe to any political ideology and I am not in any way affiliated with any political organisation." However, he also acknowledged that he has "certainly been very critical of the resurgent hard-left wing in British politics" and "critical of left-wing hysteria on the internet, and the left-wing establishment in comedy".

2021 controversial comments 

In July 2021, following the defeat of the England national football team in the final of the UEFA Euro 2020 competition on penalties to Italy, Lawrence tweeted that "All I'm saying is the white guys scored🤷‍♂️", in reference to the skin colour of the players who had scored in the penalty shootout. After a backlash, he quote tweeted his original tweet, stating that "I can see that this has offended a lot of people, and I'm sorry that black guys are bad at penalties. 🙏". Following the incident, multiple venues cancelled his upcoming shows and publicly denounced his comments as racist. He was also dropped by his agent. In November 2021, Lawrence broke his silence on the subject and posted an explanatory video to YouTube.

TV and radio credits

TV

Radio

Awards

References

External links
 
 
 
 

21st-century English comedians
Alumni of the University of St Andrews
English stand-up comedians
Living people
People educated at Tiffin School
Year of birth missing (living people)